Poul Andersen (born 28 November 1953) is a Danish footballer who played as a defender for Odense Boldklub. He made three appearances for the Denmark national team from 1978 to 1980.

References

External links
 
 

1953 births
Living people
Danish men's footballers
Association football defenders
Denmark international footballers
Denmark youth international footballers
Denmark under-21 international footballers
Odense Boldklub players